Henry Watkins Allen (April 29, 1820April 22, 1866) was a member of the Confederate States Army and the Texian Army as a soldier, also serving as a military leader, politician, writer, slave owner, and sugar cane planter.

He had made it to the rank of brigadier general in the Confederate States Army, during the American Civil War. Allen was elected as the 17th Governor of Louisiana late in the war, Allen served from January 1864 to May 1865. He was the last governor elected under Constitutional law to the post until the end of Reconstruction. He escaped to Mexico, until his death a year later. His body was returned to the United States and buried in New Orleans.

Early life and career
Allen was born on April 29, 1820, in Farmerville in Prince Edward County, Virginia. He was a Presbyterian. After attending local schools, he was educated at Marion College, Missouri. He moved to Mississippi, where he taught school and practiced law.

He served in the Texas Revolution against Mexico as a private and later as captain. He was elected as a member of the Mississippi House of Representatives in 1846, after which he studied law at Harvard University.

In 1842, Allen and Salome Ann Crane married. His wife died in 1851 at the age of 25, and she is buried in Bruinsburg, Mississippi.

Louisiana 
In February 1852, Henry Watkins Allen and William Nolan purchased the Westover Plantation in southern Louisiana. Three years later in 1855, the land was divided and split; with Nolan keeping the name Westover Plantation on his portion of land and Allen using the name Allendale Plantation for his portion of the property. His plantation was dependent on the labor of enslaved African Americans, of which he had many.

He was elected to the Louisiana Legislature in 1853.  In 1859, he went to Europe with the intention of taking part in the Italian struggle for independence but arrived too late. He toured through Europe, the incidents of which he recounted in his memoir, Travels of a Sugar Planter.

He was re-elected to the legislature during his absence. After his return, he took a prominent part in the business of that body. Allen had been a Know Nothing (American Party) in politics but joined the Democratic Party when Buchanan was nominated for president in 1856.

Confederate States Army service 
Allen enlisted as a private in the 4th Louisiana Infantry Regiment but was quickly promoted to Lieutenant Colonel on August 15, 1861. Allen became the regiment's Colonel on March 1, 1862. He was seriously wounded during the American Civil War at Shiloh and Baton Rouge.

Colonel Allen met Sarah Morgan on November 2, 1862, when he was still unable to walk due to receiving wounds in both legs at the Battle of Baton Rouge. She described him as a "wee little man" with a "dough face" in her diary which was published posthumously in the late 20th century.

In early 1863, while recuperating, Allen served as military judge of Pemberton's Army of Mississippi, at the same time also serving as major general of the Louisiana Militia. In June 1863, he suffered further injury while escaping a hotel fire at Jackson, Mississippi.

He was promoted to a brigadier general on August 19, 1863. He agreed to run and was elected governor of the portions of Louisiana still under Confederate control, taking office in January 1864; his tenure ended with the Confederacy's collapse in the spring of 1865.

As governor, Allen secured legislative passage of a law to prevent illegal impressment by Confederate agents. Another law allowed Allen to purchase medicine and to distribute it to the needy. Disabled soldiers were provided with $11 per month. Allen established new hospitals based on a combination of public and private funding. Recognizing the lack of manufacturing industry in Louisiana, he established a system of state stores, foundries, and factories with the goal of converting the works to civilian production after the war.

Because the lack of medicine was acute in the Confederacy, Allen devoted extensive time and resources toward establishing a large intelligence and covert action service which could secretly procure vital supplies, especially medicine such as quinine, from behind Union lines in New Orleans or from Mexico. State laboratories manufactured turpentine, castor oil, medicinal alcohol, and carbonate of soda.

Allen made arrangement with General Edmund Kirby-Smith to transfer to the state large amounts of cotton and sugar collected by Confederate agents as tax-in-kind until the Confederate debt could be retired.

After the Civil War
Parts of Allen's Allendale Plantation in Port Allen, Louisiana had burned down, including the Allendale sugar mill during the American Civil War (1861–1865).

As the Union army forces started taking over Confederate Louisiana, military authorities declared Governor Allen an outlaw, punishable by death upon his capture.  Historian John D. Winters, known for romanticizing the Confederacy and denigrating African Americans, wrote about Allen's leaving Louisiana to take refuge in Mexico:

With the Confederacy's end, James Madison Wells, who had been governor of Union-controlled Louisiana, became governor of the entire state. Allen moved to Mexico City and edited the Mexico Times, an English language newspaper. In November 1865, a special election was held under the Reconstruction government, with Allen (already in Mexico) defeated by Wells, with 5,497 votes to Wells' 22,312.

Death and legacy 
Allen died in Mexico City on April 22, 1866, of a stomach disorder. Allen was initially buried at Mexico City National Cemetery and Memorial, however his body was returned to New Orleans 10 years later, for burial at Lafayette Cemetery. In 1885, 19 years after his death, Allen's remains were reinterred on the grounds in front of the Old Louisiana State Capitol in Baton Rouge, in a grave marked by a rose-colored obelisk.

Many things in Louisiana have been named after Allen, and in 2020 a debate opened up on the impact of Allen's legacy since he had been a Confederate official, slaveholder, and opponent of Black political rights.

Allen Parish in western Louisiana is named for him, as is Port Allen, a small city on the west bank of the Mississippi River across from Baton Rouge. The neighborhood in which he lived in while in Shreveport was later named as Allendale.

The Henry Watkins Allen Camp #133, of the Sons of Confederate Veterans is named in his honor. Camp #435, Sons of Confederate Veterans, was chartered in 1903 as the Kirby Smith Camp, but the name was changed prior to 1935 to the Henry Watkins Allen Camp #435 in honor of Shreveport's famous resident. Camp #435 is no longer in existence.

Henry W. Allen Elementary School, a public school in New Orleans, is named for him. In 2021, the elementary school name is being debated for a name change based on Allen's controversial legacy.

A statue of Allen (1962) by sculptor Angela Gregory is located in Port Allen. In July 2020, a proposal to remove the statue was presented to the West baton Rouge Parish Council.  The council voted 6-3 not to remove the statue. A maquette of Gregory's Allen statue can be found at the West Baton Rouge Museum. A bust of Allen, along with Lee, Jackson and Beauregard, is located on the Confederate memorial in front of the Caddo Parish Courthouse in Shreveport.

See also 

 List of American Civil War generals (Confederate)

References

Further reading

External links
 
 Louisiana Secretary of State – Biography
 Cemetery Memorial by La-Cemeteries
 Political Graveyard
  – cenotaph, Baton Rouge
 , Mexico City

1820 births
1866 deaths
People from Prince Edward County, Virginia
Confederate States Army brigadier generals
Democratic Party governors of Louisiana
Confederate States of America state governors
19th-century American politicians
People of Louisiana in the American Civil War
Democratic Party members of the Louisiana House of Representatives
Members of the Mississippi House of Representatives
Texas Democrats
Harvard Law School alumni
American Presbyterians
Louisiana Know Nothings
People from Port Allen, Louisiana
American slave owners
American planters